Saint-Hilaire-Bonneval is a commune in the Haute-Vienne department in the Nouvelle-Aquitaine region in west-central France.

Geography
The river Briance forms all of the commune's western border.

See also
Communes of the Haute-Vienne department

References

Communes of Haute-Vienne